Ziesjoem! (pronounced: ZEE-SHOOM) are a Dutch music group of folk songs and popular music from Maastricht in the Netherlands. The group are locally known for their catchy, singalong music style and their costuming themes. The group currently consists of Marly Van Herpen, Jos Van Herpen and Roger Stijns.

History

Before Ziesjoem
Jos Van Herpen, was originally an occasional singer on boats part of Rederij Stiphout canal cruises in Maastricht. Eventually he asked a number of people he knew to join him as a singing act which led to the formation of Ziesjoem in 1986. Originally, the group consisted of 6 members: Mario Verhoeven, Ingrid Paulussen, Henny and Eric Hoses and Marly and Jos van Herpen. The sea shanties they sang were originally performed with a live orchestra, however they were eventually replaced with Maastricht singalongs.

First album: "Vol mèt goud gelaoje (Loaded Full with Gold)
Due to the difficulty of having a live orchestra on hand during performances, Ziesjoem used music recorded in a studio, which most often occurred at performances away from the boats they performed on. As their popularity grew with audiences, their manager Nico van Wieringen who had also started his own recording company, CL Productions in Maastricht, arranged for their first record in his studio "Vol mèt goud gelaoje" (Galleon Full of Gold), referring to the groups pirate theme at the time.

Eric Hoses, unable to combine performances with his own busy agenda eventually left the group. Also with the exit of Ingrid Paulussen, came Karen Young to the group. The popularity of Ziesjoem continued to grow with boat appearances decreasing and the number of theatre performances increasing. Eventually Ziesjoem became well known with television and newspaper appearances, their music was played in bars and on the radio.

Second album and breakthrough
Ziesjoem's great change came when they were asked to record their second album by Dutch record company 'Marlstone music', titled "Is dat daan niks Merie?" (Has that settled nothing Merie?). The album also included their biggest hit song "Zjuulke Zeuthout", which is still requested today.

The record, along with winning a competition award provided Ziesjoem with the breakthrough they needed, also winning another competition award with song: "Dreij daog laank verlore" by Dutch artists Marc Quaaden & Peter Ruijters, however the group was accused of a plagiarism scandal. Ziesjoems popularity remained high with fans, Karen and original member Henny eventually left, however fellow singers Kees & Margo Severins were often asked  to sing with the group. Karen remains an active role with Ziesjoem as a treasurer. Ziesjoem continued to perform at live events, and also participated in a Limburg singing competition with a number "Tien Vinger in de Loch" (Ten Fingers in the Loch), making it to the finals. Ziesjoem began to be requested for large events in Maastricht, as well as private events by large businesses.

Eventually band member Mario Verhoeven left, unable to combine performances with family and work, and so singer Carl Vroemen joined the group. Ziesjoem recorded their third album, "Lekker Menneke" (Good Menneke) which also proved a huge hit with its title song "Lekker Menneke". In 1988 Ziesjoem expanded publicity with the launch of their website. The attention of L1 TV in the Netherlands was soon attracted who wanted Ziesjoem to play a group of pirates for a 6-part education program on pollution. Ziesjoem was also later featured in comic style strips drawn by Peter Hermans.

Current status
An important aspect, and iconic feature of Ziesjoem are their costumes. When they formed in 1986, they formed a pirate theme with pirate-like clothing. In 1995, their costumes were re-designed, and have since then continued so with a colour or theme every 2–3 years.

In 2003, Ziesjoem celebrated their 15-year anniversary and organised the "Fries Festival" in Maastricht, referring to their hit "Friete" on their last album "Zjiemelezjo". The 2003 festival proved a great success and in 2004 another was organised in the form of a German "Bratwurst Festival". In that year, an album was made compiling their best records remastered. In 2005 they released another album "Da Maon" (The Moon) with known song "1001 Nach" on the album, one their most recent until 2008. Ziesjoem also changed their theme style, dressing as Russian tsars.

In 2009, Margo, Kees and Carl decided to leave the group, Marly and Jos decided to search for a new Ziesjoem member, which eventually was Roger Stijns. They rebranded themselves in a new form of country western theme. In that year Ziesjoem also recorded another album "Noe brant the lamp" (Don't Break the Lamp), which featured hit song "Lena".

In 2011, Ziesjoem celebrated their 25th anniversary, in June their publicity came even greater as they performed with world-famous violinist, and Maastrichtian André Rieu. and his Johann Strauss Orchestra at a live concert in Maastricht, which was also broadcast live to cinemas around the world. Their performance proved a great success, especially their number "Zjuulke Zeuthout". In October they further celebrated with their concert Ziesjoem Circus!.

See also
 Music of the Netherlands

References

External links
Ziesjoem! Official Website
Ziesjoem Biography
Ziesjoem and André Rieu - Zjuulke Zeuthout
Lena - Music Video
Karla - Music Video

Musical groups from Limburg (Netherlands)
Musicians from Maastricht